Industrial Painting  is defined by the 1959 "Manifesto of Industrial Painting: For a unitary applied art", a text by Giuseppe Pinot-Gallizio which was originally published in Notizie Arti Figurative No. 9 (1959). A French translation was soon published in Internationale Situationniste no.3 (1959). 

In May 1997, Molly Klein translated the original Italian-language version into English:

See also
Anti-art
Art manifesto

References

External links
 In Praise of Pinot Gallizio by Michèle Bernstein

Painting techniques
Art manifestos
1959 documents